Markus Hilgert (born 11 August 1969) is a German Assyriologist and cultural manager. Currently, he is the Secretary General and CEO of the Cultural Foundation of the German Federal States. From 2014 until 2018, Hilgert served as the director of the Vorderasiatisches Museum at the Pergamonmuseum in Berlin. From 2007 until 2014, Hilgert was a professor of Assyriology at Heidelberg University.

Hilgert is a member of several governing bodies and advisory boards, including the German Commission for UNESCO (since 2016)., the Foundation Board of the International Alliance for the Protection of Heritage in Conflict Areas (ALIPH; since 2017), the Advisory Group of the Cultural Protection Fund of the British Council (since 2017), the Disaster Risk Management Committee of the International Council of Museums (since 2017), and the Advisory Board of the Arcadia Fund.

Hilgert holds honorary professorships at Heidelberg University and Marburg University. In 2016, Hilgert was named National Correspondent for the German National Committee of the Blue Shield, part of the Blue Shield network, protecting heritage in armed conflict. From 2017 until 2018 he served as founding president of the German National Committee of the Blue Shield.

References

External links 
 
 Homepage of Prof. Dr. Markus Hilgert at the Philipps-Universität Marburg (CV, Publications)
 Rolf Brockschmidt: Archäologie und Textwissenschaft: Frühes Lesen auf der Agora, Tagesspiegel, 19 September 2013
 Rolf Brockschmidt, Rüdiger Schaper: An den Ufern von Babylon, Tagesspiegel, 17 March 2014
 Das Zerstörungswerk hat viele Väter. Interview mit Tilman Spreckelsen. Frankfurter Allgemeine Zeitung, 18 March 2015

German Assyriologists
1969 births
Living people